William H. Keith (born August 8, 1950) is an American author mainly contributing to military science fiction and military fiction and related game design, who writes also under several pen names, such as Ian Douglas, Robert Cain and H. Jay Riker. His newer original works are written under the name of Ian Douglas.

Early life
William H. Keith grew up with his brother J. Andrew Keith.

William H. Keith served in the United States Navy as a hospital corpsman from 1969 to 1972 during the Vietnam War era.

Career
William H. Keith Jr. and his brother J. Andrew Keith had seen ads in Journal of the Travellers Aid Society that stated that Game Designers' Workshop (GDW) was seeking authors; Loren Wiseman brought them on to begin freelancing for GDW in 1978 or 1979, and together the three of them set up a lot of the early tone for the Traveller universe. William Keith also helped to define the graphical vision of that era of Traveller books. The Keith brothers were making enough money that they were able to freelance full-time starting around 1979. The Keith brothers began working for FASA by the end of 1980, with William Keith providing art for the magazine High Passage beginning in 1981. FASA began getting into publishing adventures for Traveller beginning with Ordeal by Eshaar (1981) by the Keith brothers, who then wrote FASA's "Sky Raiders" trilogy (1981-1982). William Keith designed the role-playing game Behind Enemy Lines (1982), the first RPG set in the 1940s. When FASA ended its support of Traveller, the Keith brothers moved their Traveller writing to a new company called Gamelords, but continued working for FASA in other capacities. The Keith brothers wrote seven supplements for Gamelords, including The Mountain Environment (1983), The Undersea Environment (1983), and The Desert Environment (1984).

The Keith brothers did some work on the Chivalry & Sorcery line in 1984, and in 1985 they expanded into Fantasy Games Unlimited's other lines including Aftermath!, Daredevils, Flashing Blades, and Psi World. The Keith brothers also designed Freedom Fighters (1986), one of the last role-playing games published by FGU. William Keith authored Delta Force: America Strikes Back! (1986), the first role-playing game from Task Force Games. In 1986, FASA began publishing fiction, starting with William Keith's Decision at Thunder Rift (1986). Digest Group Publications' final publication, The MegaTraveller Journal #4 (1993), featured a huge campaign for MegaTraveller set in the Gateway sector, authored by William Keith.

William Keith became a professional artist and writer, working in the game industry with his brother Andrew, particularly for Game Designers' Workshop and FASA before becoming a full-time author. Much of his early work, including the Warstrider series, the Freedom's Rangers series, the Cybernarc series, and the Invaders of Charon series, is currently out of print; 'Warstrider' will be re-released in 2014. He was also an early author for BattleTech, writing the saga of the Gray Death Legion.

Keith also writes under various pseudonyms and "house names", including Ian Douglas and H. Jay Riker, and is a shadow author of several books "by" celebrities. He has written extensively in Keith Laumer's Bolo series, contributing several short stories to the Bolo anthologies, as well as three full-length books, Bolo Brigade, Bolo Strike, and Bolo Rising. As Ian Douglas, he writes military science fiction: the Galactic Marines series (composed of the Heritage Trilogy, the Legacy Trilogy, and the Inheritance Trilogy), and the newer Star Carrier series. As H. Jay Riker he writes military fiction: a series about the United States Navy SEALs progression from World War II through the Vietnam War, Desert Storm, and Iraqi Freedom, and another series, The Silent Service, about the United States submarine service.

Other novels include Diplomatic Act with Peter Jurasik, and Two of Minds, nominated for a Newbery Award. He also continued Keith Laumer's Retief series with Retief's Peace. His first non-fiction book, The Science of the Craft, was published in 2005; it is about the link between witchcraft and science.

Keith's recent work includes three books in Stephen Coonts' Deep Black series; a police procedural/detective novel in the Android universe; and a new series about Navy Hospital Corpsmen in the future.

Keith, a Wiccan and a Reiki master, is also a member of Western Pennsylvania Mensa.

Bibliography 

Significant works

Writing as William H. Keith Jr.:

BattleTech series
 Blood of Heroes (with J. Andrew Keith) (1993) 
 Tactics of Duty (1995) , reprinted as 
 Operation Excalibur (1996) , reprinted as 

Writing as Ian Douglas:

Heritage Trilogy
 Semper Mars (1998) 
 Luna Marine (1999) 
 Europa Strike (2000) 
Legacy Trilogy
 Star Corps (2003) 
 Battlespace (2006) 
 Star Marines (2007) 
Inheritance Trilogy
 Star Strike (2008) 
 Galactic Corps (2008) 
 Semper Human (2009) 
Star Corpsman Series
 Bloodstar (2012) 
 Abyss Deep (2013) 
Star Carrier series
 Earth Strike (2010) 
 Center of Gravity (2011) 
 Singularity (2012) 
 Deep Space (2013) 
 Dark Matter (2014) 
 Deep Time (2015) 
 Dark Mind (4-25-2017)  
 Bright Light (11-27-2018) 
 Stargods (11-26-2020) 

Andromedan Dark
 Altered Starscape (2016) 
 Darkness Falling (2017) 
Solar Warden
 Alien Secrets (2020) 
 Alien Hostiles (2021) 
 Alien Agendas (2023) 

Writing as Robert Cain:

Cybernarc series
 Cybernarc (1991) 
 Gold Dragon (1991) 
 Island Kill (1992) 
 Capo's Revenge (1992) 
 Shark Bait (1992) 
 End Game (1993) 

Writing as H. Jay Riker

SEALS The Warrior Breed series:
 Silver Star (1993) 
 Purple Heart (1994) 
 Bronze Star (1995) 
 Navy Cross (1996) 
 Medal of Honor (1997) 
 Marks of Valor (1998) 
 In Harm's Way (1999) 
 Duty's Call (2000) 
 Casualties of War (2003) 
 Enduring Freedom (2005) 
 Iraqi Freedom (2007) 
Silent Service Series:
 Grayback Class (2000) 
 Los Angeles Class (2001) 
 Seawolf Class (2002) 
 Virginia Class (2004) 
 Ohio Class (2006)

References

External links
 Author's Homepage

1950 births
Living people
20th-century American male artists
20th-century American male writers
20th-century American non-fiction writers
20th-century American novelists
20th-century American short story writers
20th-century pseudonymous writers
21st-century American essayists
21st-century American historians
21st-century American male artists
21st-century American male writers
21st-century American non-fiction writers
21st-century American novelists
21st-century American short story writers
21st-century pseudonymous writers
American conceptual artists
American contemporary artists
American game designers
20th-century American historians
American illustrators
American male essayists
American male non-fiction writers
American male novelists
American male short story writers
American military personnel of the Vietnam War
American multimedia artists
American occult writers
American science fiction writers
American speculative fiction artists
American speculative fiction critics
American speculative fiction writers
American video game designers
American Wiccans
Artists from Pennsylvania
Artists from Pittsburgh
Board game designers
Mensans
Military science fiction writers
Novelists from Pennsylvania
Place of birth missing (living people)
Reiki practitioners
Role-playing game artists
Role-playing game designers
Science fiction critics
United States Navy corpsmen
Wiccan novelists
Wiccan writers
Writers from Pittsburgh